CJ Kettler is an American television producer, media executive, and entrepreneur. She has held senior management positions with Hearst, MTV Networks, Vestron, Oxygen Media, Channel One News, Travelzoo, LIME, and others. 
 
Kettler served as CEO and chair of Channel One News (2012–2014) and after selling it to Houghton Mifflin Harcourt, she served as EVP, chief of consumer brands and strategy at HMH until May 2017. As of December 2017, Kettler serves as the president of King Features Syndicate, a division of Hearst.

Career
After completing Bachelor of Arts degree in sociology from Smith College, Kettler started her career at CBS in programming research, moving on to McCann Erickson and then MTV. At Vestron Video she managed the Children’s Video Library.

After selling Sunbow Entertainment to Sony, Kettler worked as president of sales and marketing at Oxygen Media. In 2005, she founded the lifestyle brand LIME. Lime was sold to Gaiam in July 2007.

From 2008 to 2013, Kettler was a partner at Propeller Partners. She served as president of Travelzoo, and also held positions at CBS, McCann-Erickson, Vestron, and MTV Networks. 
Kettler joined Channel Channel One News as CEO in November 2012. And served as EVP, Chief of Consumer Brands & Strategy at HMH until May 2017.

In December 2017, she was named as the president of King Features Syndicate to focus on their new initiatives across multiple media platforms.

Production credits
As a television producer, Kettler was nominated for an Emmy for Outstanding Children’s Program for Carmen Sandiego. She produced several animated series. She is currently executive producer of The Cuphead Show! For  Netflix. Her credits include:

Appointments and awards
Kettler is on the board of directors at the Environmental Working Group. In 2006, she received The Highest Leaf Award from the Women’s Venture Fund. In 2018, she received Emmy nomination for Carmen Sandiego, Outstanding Children’s Program.

References  

Year of birth missing (living people)
Living people
American television executives
Smith College alumni
Place of birth missing (living people)